A Family Secret is a 2006 Canadian comedy-drama film.

Plot 

Set on New Year's Day, Jos' (David Boutin) family and friends gather together at a funeral parlour where chaos ensues.

Awards and nominations 
A Family Secret earned two Genie Award nominations (Genie Award for Best Performance by an Actress in a Leading Role for Ginette Reno and Genie Award for Best Original Screenplay) and won a Stony Brook Film Festival award for Best Feature.

External links 
 Starz Denver Film Festival 2007
 

2006 films
2006 comedy-drama films
Films scored by Normand Corbeil
Films shot in Montreal
Canadian comedy-drama films
French-language Canadian films
2000s Canadian films